Henry Bruen may refer to:
 Henry Bruen (1741–1795), Irish politician, Member of the Parliament of Ireland for Jamestown 1783–1790 and Carlow County 1790–1795
 Henry Bruen (1789–1852), Irish politician, Member of the UK Parliament for County Carlow 1812–1831, 1835–1837, 1840–1852
 Henry Bruen (1828–1912), his son, MP for County Carlow 1857–1880

See also
Bruen (surname)